Heiko Scholz (born 7 January 1966) is a German former professional footballer who is the assistant coach of Dynamo Dresden.

Club career
Heiko Scholz was part of one of only three East German club sides which reached a final in a European cup competition: He lost the Cup Winners' Cup Final in 1987 with Lokomotive Leipzig against Ajax. In East and unified Germany the midfielder played 296 top-flight matches.

International career
Scholz represented both East Germany (seven caps) and unified Germany (one cap) internationally.

References

External links

Living people
1966 births
People from Görlitz
People from Bezirk Dresden
German footballers
East German footballers
Footballers from Saxony
Association football fullbacks
Dual internationalists (football)
Germany international footballers
East Germany international footballers
DDR-Oberliga players
Bundesliga players
Dynamo Dresden players
FC Sachsen Leipzig players
1. FC Lokomotive Leipzig players
Bayer 04 Leverkusen players
SV Werder Bremen players
SC Fortuna Köln players
SG Wattenscheid 09 players
Dresdner SC players
German football managers
2. Bundesliga managers
MSV Duisburg managers
FC Viktoria Köln managers
1. FC Lokomotive Leipzig managers
Dynamo Dresden managers